La mujer desnuda (The Naked Woman) is a Mexican drama film directed by Fernando Méndez. It was released in 1953 and starring Meche Barba and Antonio Aguilar.

Plot
A cabaret dancer, daughter of a circus clown, marries a famous singer. When everything seems to be happiness for both, a former lover of the young woman returns from her past to blackmail and not reveal her dark past.

Cast
 Meche Barba
 Antonio Aguilar
 Miguel Torruco
 Carlos López Moctezuma
 María Victoria

Reviews
In this film Meche Barba does not appear naked as the title suggests, but she was painted gold, and then dressed in expensive fur coats in a gruesome story with melodramatic ending. The film was vetoed by the now defunct League of The Decency. Highlights the great photograph of Agustín Martínez Solares that gives a touch of Film noir with the singer Antonio Aguilar as a sort of Mexican Victor Mature who just handing him tremendous beating to the villain Miguel Torruco.

References

External links
 

1953 films
Mexican black-and-white films
Rumberas films
1950s Spanish-language films
Mexican drama films
1953 drama films
1950s Mexican films